Cathy Sisler is an American artist, born in Wisconsin.

Since 1965, she has been living in Newfoundland.  She is a musician, writer and a touring performance artist.

In 1997, her piece Lullaby for the Almost Falling Woman, concerning a woman seeking employment and experiencing a series of falls, won Prix de jury at the festival du Cinéma et des Nouveaux Médias. Her 1994 film Mr B. presented Sisler herself in drag as a man.

She is a member of English/French language female performance art group, Groupe Intervention Video.

Her name appears in the lyrics of the Le Tigre song "Hot Topic."

References

External links
Groupe Intervention Video biography
Groupe Intervention Video homepage

American performance artists
Canadian performance artists
Women performance artists
Canadian women artists
American emigrants to Canada
Artists from Newfoundland and Labrador
Living people
Year of birth missing (living people)